Ebbw Vale (High Level) railway station was a station on a short branch from the London and North Western Railway's Heads of the Valleys line which served the town of Ebbw Vale in the Welsh county of Monmouthshire.

History
The line was leased and operated by the London and North Western Railway (L&NWR) which acquired the smaller railway company on 30 June 1866. On 2 September 1867, a branch was opened to Ebbw Vale. Ebbw Vale was reached by the  Beaufort Viaduct before reaching Ebbw Vale Junction and the  Rhyd Viaduct. Much of the branch descended towards Ebbw Vale on 1 in 42 gradient. A connection ran north-eastwards to the Ebbw Vale Iron Works. A substantial amount of freight was carried to and from the ironworks.

The station was sandwiched between James Street and Market Street, with the main station building facing the latter. St James Methodist Church was prominent behind the single platform which backed on to James Street. A signal box was at the south end of the station before the point where the line crossed Market Street on the level. The station was near the Great Western Railway's own Ebbw Vale station and there was considerable rivalry between this company and the L&NWR. The L&NWR insisted that the signalman manning the signalbox descend to ring a handbell five minutes before the departure of a train and again once it had left. The station booking office was closed two minutes before the departure of a train which resulted in late would-be passengers having to wait outside a locked gate until the train departed. To distinguish the two Ebbw Vale stations, British Railways added the suffix "High Level" (the L&NWR station) and "Low Level" (the GWR station) on 23 May 1949.

The High Level station suffered from the disadvantage that, although it was more centrally-located than the Low Level, services went to Brynmawr and not to  where most passengers wished to travel. Passenger services, which at that time consisted of two each way on weekdays and five extra services on Saturdays, were withdrawn from the branch on 5 February 1951, although goods facilities were provided until 2 November 1959.

Present
The station site has been redeveloped as a shopping complex, having previously been a multi-storey car park. The angle of the building to the road follows the former railway alignment.

References

Citations

Sources

Disused railway stations in Blaenau Gwent
Former London and North Western Railway stations
Railway stations in Great Britain opened in 1867
Railway stations in Great Britain closed in 1951
1867 establishments in Wales
1959 disestablishments in Wales